Gregor von Bochmann (1 June 1850, Nehatu, Kreis Wiek, Governorate of Estonia – 12 February 1930, Hösel, near Düsseldorf) was a Baltic-German landscape and genre painter.

Biography 
His father was a forest warden for the Governorate of Estonia, who had been ennobled due to his service in the Crimean War. Bochmann frequently travelled around the country with him, developing his ability to observe nature. From 1862 to 1868, he studied at the Gustav Adolf Grammar School in Tallinn, where his art teacher, Theodor Albert Sprengel, recognized his talent and obtained a scholarship for him to study at the Kunstakademie Düsseldorf.

After studying drawing and antiquities, he attended the landscape class of Oswald Achenbach and, after graduation in 1871, established his own studios nearby. Further study trips were made to Holland, Belgium and his native Estonia and the sketches he made there served as the basis for much of his later work. In 1877, he married Emilie Poensgen, the daughter of industrialist , an iron and steel manufacturer. Their children included the sculptor, Gregor von Bochmann, known as "The Younger".

He exhibited widely, throughout Germany and Austria and, notably, at the Exposition Universelle (1878), and received numerous awards. In 1893, he became a member of the Academy of Arts, Berlin and, two years later, was awarded the title of "Royal Prussian Professor". In 1899, he was granted his own title of nobility by Kaiser Wilhelm II.

He also served on the board of the Deutscher Künstlerbund.

References

Further reading 
 Julia Hümme: Gregor von Bochmann (1850–1930). Leben und Werk eines deutsch-baltischen Malers in Düsseldorf (Dissertation). Verlag Ludwig, Kiel, 2007, 
 Silke Köhn: Gregor von Bochmann 1850–1930. Sammler Journal, April 2009, pgs.72–79
 Der Maler Gregor von Bochmann. Katalog zur Ausstellung Galerie an der Börse, Düsseldorf from August 3 to 17, 2002,

External links 

 ArtNet: More works by Bochmann
 Gregor von Bochmann website, by his great-grandson, Dr.Gregor von Bochmann.

1850 births
1930 deaths
People from Lääneranna Parish
People from Kreis Wiek
Baltic-German people
Landscape painters
Genre painters
19th-century Estonian painters
19th-century Estonian male artists
20th-century Estonian painters
20th-century Estonian male artists
Painters from the Russian Empire